Coolin' at the Playground Ya Know! is the debut studio album from American hip hop and R&B group Another Bad Creation, released on February 11, 1991 on Motown.

The album peaked at number seven on the Billboard 200 chart. By May 1991, it was certified platinum in sales by the RIAA, after sales exceeding 1,000,000 copies in the United States.

Release and reception

The album peaked at seven on the U.S. Billboard 200 and reached the second spot on the R&B Albums chart. The album was certified gold in April 1991 and platinum the following month.

Rob Theakston of Allmusic called the album "an enjoyable, infectious, bubblegum/R&B record," and noted that the work "unquestionably helped to re-position Motown's status as the dominant force in R&B."

Track listing

Charts

Album

Singles

"—" denotes releases that did not chart.

Certifications

Personnel
Information taken from Allmusic.
arranging – Dallas Austin
engineering – Dallas Austin, Jim Hinger, Darin Prindle, Christopher Shaw, Rick Sheppard
production – Rico Anderson, Dallas Austin, Dr. Freeze
programming – Rick Sheppard
vocals – Dallas Austin, Biv, Grecco Bush, Regina Chapman, Todd Harris, Tracy Harris, Rene Pugh, Racer X, Desiaray Shelton, Kevin Wales
vocals (background) – Another Bad Creation, Boyz II Men, Dr. Freeze, Debra Killings

Notes

External links
 
 Coolin' at the Playground Ya Know! at Discogs

1991 debut albums
Albums produced by Dallas Austin
Another Bad Creation albums
Motown albums